Vanuatu competed at the 1992 Summer Olympics in Barcelona, Spain.

Competitors
The following is the list of number of competitors in the Games.

Athletics

Men

Track events

Women

Track events

References

Official Olympic Reports

Nations at the 1992 Summer Olympics
1992
1992 in Vanuatuan sport